Cuvergnon is a commune in the Oise department, Hauts-de-France, northern France.

See also
Communes of the Oise department

References

Communes of Oise